The Social Democratic Party (abbreviated PSD) is a right-wing Nicaraguan political party that split from Conservatives in 1979. The party sought affiliation to the Socialist International, but its application was rejected.

The PSD abstained from 1984 elections. As of 2006, the PSD was in an electoral alliance with the Constitutionalist Liberal Party (PLC).

References

Political parties established in 1979
Political parties in Nicaragua